Wallace Edgar Brown (October 8, 1904 – November 13, 1961) was an American actor and comedian. In the 1940s, he performed as the comic partner of Alan Carney.

Early years 
Wallace Edgar Brown was born in Malden, Massachusetts, the son of Herbert and Lillian (Garnier) Brown. His father was a compositor for the Malden Evening News. Brown left Malden High School during his junior year, but he later graduated from Malden Commercial Business School and took courses at Chicago University. Before his career in entertainment began, he worked at a drug-store soda fountain in Malden, was a second chef at a hotel in York Beach, Maine, and was a printer's devil at a print shop in Boston, among other jobs. He also performed locally with his father as an amateur.

Early career
Brown debuted professionally in Beacon Falls, Pennsylvania, with the Jimmy Evans Song Box Revue. In addition to entertaining, he handled baggage for the troupe. After that, he began performing with the Carson Sisters. He performed in vaudeville for 15 years before his first appearance in film.

Film
Brown began his film career in 1942 in Hollywood at RKO Radio Pictures with the film Petticoat Larceny. When RKO decided to emulate the comedy team Abbott and Costello, he was paired with Alan Carney, creating "Brown & Carney."

The duo premiered with the military comedies Adventures of a Rookie and its sequel, Rookies in Burma.  Of their eight films together, one of the most notable was Zombies on Broadway co-starring Bela Lugosi, a semisequel to Val Lewton's I Walked With a Zombie.  Brown and Carney's contracts were terminated in 1946, after which they pursued solo careers.  In the 1940s and 1950s, both appeared in various roles for Leslie Goodwins films.  They reunited in 1961 in Disney's The Absent-Minded Professor.

Brown was later teamed with Tim Ryan in the Columbia Pictures short film French Fried Frolic in 1949.  He was also teamed with Jack Kirkwood in four RKO Pictures short films in 1950 and 1951.

Along with Alan Carney, Brown was to be given a role in It's a Mad, Mad, Mad, Mad World (1963), but died not long before filming began.

Television and radio
On television, Brown portrayed Jed Fame on Cimarron City and Chauncey Kowalski on The Roaring 20's. 

In 1953, Brown had billing over an unknown Paul Newman in the fourth-season premiere episode of The Web, titled "One for the Road". 

He made several guest appearances on Perry Mason, including in the role of murderer Harry Mitchell in the 1958 episode "The Case of the Gilded Lily". Brown had also been a regular cast member in television shows such as I Married Joan and Daniel Boone. Brown's last years were filled with guest appearances in television, his last one in My Three Sons. 

On radio, Brown was a regular on The Abbott and Costello Show.

Personal life and death
Brown was married to dancer Mildred Lane, and they had a son and a daughter. On November 13, 1961, he died of a throat hemorrhage in Valley Presbyterian Hospital in Los Angeles, aged 57.

Filmography

 Dodge City (1939) - Cattle Auctioneer (uncredited)
 All Through the Night (1942) - 2nd Police Lieutenant (uncredited)
 Radio Runaround (1943, Short) - Harry, Radio Station Announcer
 Mexican Spitfire's Blessed Event (1943, with Alan Carney, but not as a team) - Sagebrush Inn Desk Clerk (uncredited)
 Petticoat Larceny (1943) - Sam Colfax
 The Adventures of a Rookie (1943, with Alan Carney) - Jerry Miles
 The Seventh Victim (1943) - Durk (uncredited)
 Gangway for Tomorrow (1943) - Sam
 Around the World (1943) - Clipper Pilot
 Rookies in Burma (1943, with Alan Carney) - Jerry Miles
 Seven Days Ashore (1944, with Alan Carney) - Monty Stephens
 Step Lively (1944, with Alan Carney) - Binion
 Girl Rush (1944, with Alan Carney) - Jerry Miles
 Zombies on Broadway (1945, with Alan Carney) - Jerry Miles
 Radio Stars on Parade (1945, with Alan Carney) - Jerry Miles
 From This Day Forward (1946) - Jake Beesley
 Notorious (1946) - Mr. Hopkins
 Genius at Work (1946, with Alan Carney) - Jerry Miles
 Lady Luck (1946) - Narrator (voice, uncredited)
 Vacation in Reno (1946, with Alan Carney, but not as a team) - Eddie Roberts
 Bachelor Blues (1948, Short) - Dorothy's Boyfriend
 Family Honeymoon (1948) - Tom Roscoe
 Backstage Follies (1948, Short)
 Heart Troubles (1949, Short) - Wally
 Come to the Stable (1949) - Howard Sheldon - Bob's Agent (uncredited)
 French Fried Frolic (1949, Short, With Tim Ryan) - Wally
 Put Some Money in the Pot (1950, Short, With Jack Kirkwood) - Wally
 Photo Phonies (1950, Short) - Wally
 Brooklyn Buckaroos (1950, Short, With Jack Kirkwood) - Wally
 Tinhorn Troubadors (1951, Short, With Jack Kirkwood) - Wally
 As Young as You Feel (1951) - Horace Gallagher
 From Rogues to Riches (1951, Short, With Jack Kirkwood) - Wally
 The High and the Mighty (1954) - Lenny Wilby, navigator
 Untamed (1955) - Secondary Role (uncredited)
 The Wild Dakotas (1956) - McGraw
 Untamed Youth (1957) - Pinky, the cook
 The Joker Is Wild (1957) - Las Vegas Heckler (uncredited)
 The Left Handed Gun (1958) - Deputy Moon
 Wink of an Eye (1958) - Sheriff Cantrick
 Alias Jesse James (1959) - Dirty Dog Bartender (uncredited)
 Westbound (1959) - Stubby
 The Mouse That Roared (1959) - Air Raid Warden (uncredited)
 Holiday for Lovers (1959) - Joe McDougal
 The Best of Everything (1959) - Drunk (uncredited)
 Who Was That Lady? (1960) - Irate Man on Telephone (uncredited)
 The Absent-Minded Professor (1961) - Coach Elkins
 My Darling Judge (1961, TV Movie)
 The George Raft Story (1961) - Mike Jones (uncredited)

See also
 Brown and Carney

References

Further reading
 Terrace, Vincent.  Radio Programs, 1924-1984.  Jefferson, NC: McFarland, 1999.

External links
 
 
 

1904 births
1961 deaths
American male comedians
Vaudeville performers
American male radio actors
American male film actors
20th-century American male actors
RKO Pictures contract players
Burials at Forest Lawn Memorial Park (Hollywood Hills)
20th-century American comedians